Megasurcula guayasensis is an extinct species of sea snail, a marine gastropod mollusk in the family Pseudomelatomidae, the turrids and allies.

Description

Distribution
Fossils of this marine species have been found in Miocene strata in Ecuador.

References

External links
 California Academy of Sciences: photo of Megasurcula guayasensis
 Bulletin of American Paleontology,  California Acad. Sci., Proc, 4th ser., 4, VOL. XXXIII (1949-1952)

guayasensis
Gastropods described in 1951